Flower News (or The Flower News) is a private weekly newspaper first published in 2004 in Burma by the e-Empire Media Group.

See also
List of newspapers in Burma

References

External links
 issue of The Flower News

Weekly newspapers published in Myanmar